Local government in Malaysia, according to Local Government Act 1971 of Malaysia, means city councils, municipal councils and district councils.

City council

Local governments administrating a city are normally called City Council (Majlis Bandaraya). However, there are local authorities which are called City Hall (Dewan Bandaraya). The usage of the term "city hall" is a possible misnomer since a city hall normally refers to the building which houses a city council instead of the local council itself.

Pasir Gudang City Council, having received city status on 22 November 2020, is the newest City Council formed in Malaysia following Kuantan Municipal Council which received city status on 21 February 2021.

Municipal council
Local governments administrating a municipality are called Municipal Council (Majlis Perbandaran).

Hulu Selangor in Selangor is the latest local government area to receive Municipal status, having done so on 21 October 2021.

District council
Local governments administrating a normal district are called District Council (Majlis Daerah).

Special or modified local government
The following bodies are classified as special or modified local government.

Notes

References

External links 
 Pihak Berkuasa Tempatan

Lists of subdivisions of Malaysia
Malaysia geography-related lists
Malaysia politics-related lists